Nakło  is a village in the administrative district of Gmina Lelów, within Częstochowa County, Silesian Voivodeship, in southern Poland.

Architectural relics include a brick church built at the turn of the 17th and 18th centuries and consecrated in 1726 by Bishop Augustine Wessel, and an 18th-century neoclassical palace. The Palace at Nakło was designed by Polish economist and royal architect Jan Ferdynand Nax. 

The village has a population of 614.

References

Villages in Częstochowa County